Rui Veloso e Amigos (Rui Veloso and Friends) is the tenth studio album by Rui Veloso. The album was released on 26 November 2012 through EMI.

It is a collaborative album with multiple Lusophone artists, with whom Veloso reinterprets thirteen songs from his career.

Track listing

Charts

References 

Rui Veloso albums
2012 albums
EMI Records albums